Alucita illuminatrix is a species of moth of the family Alucitidae. It is known from Cameroon.

References

Endemic fauna of Cameroon
Alucitidae
Insects of Cameroon
Moths of Africa
Moths described in 1929
Taxa named by Edward Meyrick